The Mandell L. and Madeleine H. Berman Foundation was founded by Mandell L. Berman as a vehicle for his charitable giving. The foundation supports research and study of the American Jewish community.

Notable Projects
Berman Jewish Policy Archive @ NYU Wagner, a centralized electronic database of Jewish communal policy research.
 North American Jewish Data Bank, a centralized electronic database of Jewish demographic studies (see NJPS).

See also
Mandell Berman
Philanthropy
Foundation (charity)

References

Foundations based in the United States
Jewish charities based in the United States